The Orb's Adventures Beyond the Ultraworld is the debut studio album by English electronic music group The Orb, released as a double album on 2 April 1991 by Big Life. It is a continuous, progressive composition evoking a two-hour psychedelic trip that draws from various genres (including ambient, house, dub reggae, and hip hop) and incorporates samples and sound effects. Much of the album was recorded after founding member Jimmy Cauty left the group, leaving Alex Paterson as the central member, with additional contributions by Andy Falconer, Kris Weston, and others.

The album was preceded by the charting (#78) 1989 single "A Huge Ever Growing Pulsating Brain That Rules from the Centre of the Ultraworld," which closes the album. The Orb's Adventures Beyond the Ultraworld was well received in Europe and reached number 29 on the UK Albums Chart. It has since been credited with popularizing the UK's nascent ambient house movement.

Background
Alex Paterson began his music career in the 1980s as a roadie for the post-punk band Killing Joke before eventually leaving in 1986 to pursue his own musical interests. Influenced by the growing popularity of Chicago house music in Britain during the decade, shortly thereafter he began working with another ambient house pioneer, Jimmy Cauty, who had been involved in the Killing Joke side-project Brilliant with Paterson's childhood friend Youth. Paterson, Cauty and Youth also performed chillout DJ sets in Paul Oakenfold's Land of Oz night in the club Heaven. Paterson said of these events:

Following success in the singles market with their releases as The Orb, including 1988's Tripping on Sunshine and the Kiss EP and A Huge Ever Growing Pulsating Brain That Rules from the Centre of the Ultraworld, both released in 1989, Paterson and Cauty started work on the first Orb album but split in April 1990 due to disagreements about releasing The Orb's work on Cauty and Bill Drummond's record label KLF Communications. While Cauty released his portions of the planned album as Space and continued with his other group The KLF, Paterson moved on to his next collaboration, "Little Fluffy Clouds", in autumn 1990 with Youth. The track was recorded by an 18-year-old studio engineer and future Orb collaborator, Kris "Thrash" Weston.

Music
Slant Magazine called the album a blend of "loping house beats and shades of reggae-dub with atmospheric sampladelia (film dialogue, wildlife, radio broadcasts, strings and choirs)" which defined the ambient house movement of the early 1990s. International DJ noted the album's "then unique blend of head-nodding grooves (often recycled from old hip hop and dub reggae records), horizontal ambience, and all manner of tongue-in-cheek spoken word samples."

Release
In April 1991, the Orb released The Orb's Adventures Beyond the Ultraworld for an audience familiar with their groundbreaking singles and several John Peel radio sessions. The album was received in the United Kingdom and Europe with critical acclaim and reached number 29 on the UK Albums Chart.

By mid-1991, The Orb had signed a deal to release the album in the United States but were forced to edit the double-disc 109:41-minute UK release down to one 70:41-minute disc. This version replaced "Perpetual Dawn" with a remix by Youth and "Star 6 & 7 8 9" with its "Phase II" version, both available on the "Perpetual Dawn" single; and removed "Back Side of the Moon" and "Spanish Castles in Space" entirely. The full double-disc version and cassette were later released in the US by Island Records.

Artwork
The cover for The Orb's Adventures Beyond the Ultraworld was designed by graphic design collective The Designers Republic, who is credited for "orbsonic love deep space & sampling image" in the liner notes. The album booklet features an image of the Battersea Power Station, as photographed by Richard Cheadle and "treated by dr/chromagene", as well as an image of cumulonimbus clouds over the Congo Basin, taken from the Space Shuttle Challenger on 1 April 1983. The Battersea Power Station image was utilized as cover art for the US release of the album.

Reception

In a contemporary review of The Orb's Adventures Beyond the Ultraworld, the NME dubbed it "an album sounding like Pink Floyd without all the self-indulgent solos", concluding that "Reality is inside a pair of headphones overflowing with The Orb. Life will never be the same again. The flotation tank beckons." Selects Russell Brown wrote that "long and strange as it is, Adventures Beyond the Ultraworld is without doubt a good trip." At the end of 1991, Melody Maker ranked it at number 22 on their year-end top albums list, adding that it contained "some of the most unique sounds of the year."

In the years following its release, The Orb's Adventures Beyond the Ultraworld has received continued critical acclaim. A 1993 list of the greatest albums of all-time by NME placed the album at number 45. In 1999, Spin ranked it at number 82 on their list of the best albums of the 1990s, with critic Richard Gehr opining that "Ultraworld is art at its most functional: It works equally well as both acid-peak booster rocket and as Prozac-ian relief from an ecstatic all-nighter." In 2002, Muzik named it the seventh best dance music album of all-time, while Slant Magazine deemed it the fourth greatest electronic music album of the 20th century. The following year, Pitchforks decade-end list ranked the album at number 100, with Alex Linhardt's accompanying write-up noting that it "managed to make ambient house a perpetual 'next big thing' for the rest of the decade." John Bush of AllMusic cited The Orb's Adventures Beyond the Ultraworld as "the album that defined the ambient house movement."

Track listing

Original UK release (double album)

 On CD, Sides 1 & 2 appeared on Disc 1 (the "orbit compact disc") and Sides 3 & 4 appeared on Disc 2 (the "ultraworld compact disc".)

Original US release

 On CD, Sides 1, 2, 3 & 4 appeared on 1 disc.

2006 UK deluxe edition

Tracks details

Instrumentation and samples
 "Little Fluffy Clouds":
 A vocal sample of John Waite, presenter of Face the Facts ("Over the past few years to the traditional sounds of an English summer, the droning of lawnmowers, the smack of leather on willow, has been added a new noise.")
 "A Conversation with Rickie Lee Jones" by Rickie Lee Jones, an interview from a promotional CD which came with some copies of her album Flying Cowboys. This sample was the subject of litigation.
 "Electric Counterpoint: III. Fast" by Steve Reich, performed by Pat Metheny
 "Man with a Harmonica" by Ennio Morricone
 "Jump into the Fire" by Harry Nilsson, source of the main drum loop.
 "Earth (Gaia)"
 Dialogue by Max von Sydow and Peter Wyngarde from the film Flash Gordon
 Vocal samples of the Apollo 11 moon landing from the documentary film For All Mankind
 Hendrick Van Dyke from the Family Bible Reading Fellowship reading Book of Amos 9:13–15
 At 6:19 into the track, a sample of a Lithuanian news report: "Jie pasirašė lyg ir sutartį su Azerbaidžiano komunistų partija. [...] Didelį svorį pajuto tautiškai nusiteikę azerbaidžianiečiai, jų populiarusis Laisvės Frontas, kuris būtų tolygus mūsų Sąjudžiui. Jie pasirašė lyg ir sutartį su Azerbaidžiano komunistų partija." ("They seem to have signed the agreement with the Communist Party of Azerbaijan [...] Nationally minded Azerbaijanis felt their big weight, their popular Freedom Front, which would be equivalent to our Sąjūdis movement. They seem to have signed the agreement with the Communist Party of Azerbaijan".)
 "Supernova at the End of the Universe"
 "Synthetic Substition" by Melvin Bliss
 Various flight instructions from Apollo 11 and Apollo 17 from the NASA documentary For All Mankind.
 Various NASA samples
 A vocal sample of Slim Pickens shouting "Yahoo!" from the film Dr. Strangelove or: How I Learned to Stop Worrying and Love the Bomb
 "Back Side of the Moon"
 Various NASA samples
 A vocal sample from the album Some Product: Carri on Sex Pistols by the Sex Pistols.
 "Spanish Castles in Space"
 "Spartacus Love Theme" by Bill Evans
 Narration from the Soviet field recording album Звуковые И Биоэлектрические Сигналы Рыб (Audio and Bioelectric Signals of Fishes)
 "Perpetual Dawn"
 "Peppermint Twist" by Joey Dee and the Starliters
 "Into the Fourth Dimension"
 A vocal excerpt from "Miserere" by Gregorio Allegri.
 An excerpt from the 2nd Movement of the "L'amoroso" Violin Concerto in E major, RV271 by Antonio Vivaldi.
 "Outlands"
 "Love Without Sound" by White Noise
 "Blackboard Jungle Dub" by Lee "Scratch" Perry
 "A Conversation with Rickie Lee Jones" by Rickie Lee Jones, an interview from a promotional CD which came with some copies of her album Flying Cowboys. This sample was the subject of litigation.
 "Some Love" by New Age Steppers
 "Hot Tip" by Prince Django
 "Europe Endless" by Kraftwerk.
 An organ sound patch from a Casio CZ-101 synthesizer
 "A Huge Ever Growing Pulsating Brain That Rules from the Centre of the Ultraworld"
 "Lovin' You" by Minnie Riperton
 "Slave to the Rhythm" by Grace Jones

Personnel
Credits for The Orb's Adventures Beyond the Ultraworld adapted from liner notes.

 Alex Paterson – production, engineering, mixing
 Jimmy Cauty – production ("A Huge Ever Growing Pulsating Brain That Rules from the Centre of the Ultraworld")
 Andy Falconer – production ("Into the Fourth Dimension"), engineering, mixing
 Thomas Fehlmann – mixing
 Miquette Giraudy – production ("Supernova at the End of the Universe", "Back Side of the Moon")
 Steve Hillage – production ("Supernova at the End of the Universe", "Back Side of the Moon")
 Greg Hunter – engineering (assistant)
 Eddie Maiden – production ("Perpetual Dawn")
 Guy Pratt – bass ("Spanish Castles in Space")
 Tim Russell – engineering, mixing
 Kris "Thrash" Weston – engineering, mixing
 Youth – production ("Little Fluffy Clouds"), mixing

Release history

Footnotes

References

External links

 Sample attributions from Babylon and Ting

The Orb albums
1991 debut albums
Albums with cover art by The Designers Republic
Ambient house albums